Nawcz  is a village in the administrative district of Gmina Łęczyce, within Wejherowo County, Pomeranian Voivodeship, in northern Poland. The village has a population of 252.

For details of the history of the region, see History of Pomerania.

Auffanglager Nawitz
During the occupation of Poland by the Third Reich in World War II, the village was the location of the forced-labour camp Nawitz, set up as one of 40 subcamps of the notorious Nazi German Stutthof concentration camp near Gdańsk.

References

Villages in Wejherowo County
Holocaust locations in Poland